The fifth season of RuPaul's Drag Race All Stars was announced by VH1 on August 19, 2019.

On February 20, 2020, the show's official Twitter account announced the season premiere date of June 5, 2020, on Showtime. Following the cast announcement on May 8, 2020, producers announced that the show would instead air on VH1 due to the COVID-19 pandemic, which caused "various scheduling and programming adjustments".

The official trailer announced a change in the elimination rules: Unlike seasons 2, 3, and 4 of All Stars, only a single challenge winner is named each week. The winning queen then lip syncs for her legacy against a guest Lip Sync Assassin from a previous season. If the challenge winner wins the lip sync, she gains the power to eliminate one of the queens in the bottom and win a $10,000 prize. If the Assassin wins, the eliminated queen is determined after a majority vote by the rest of the contestants, and the $10,000 prize rolls over to further episodes until a contestant wins the lip sync.

The winner of RuPaul's Drag Race All Stars received a one-year supply of Anastasia Beverly Hills Cosmetics and a cash prize of $100,000. All Stars 5 was the first All Stars season since All Stars 1 to have an Untucked aftershow. Shea Couleé was declared the winner, with Jujubee and Miz Cracker named runners-up.

Jujubee later on competed on RuPaul's Drag Race: UK vs the World, placing 3rd/4th. Shea Couleé later competed on the seventh season of All Stars, the first all-winners season of Drag Race, placing 3rd/4th.

Contestants 

Ages, names, and cities stated are at time of filming.

Contestant progress

Lip syncs
Legend:

Voting history

Guest judges

Ricky Martin, actor and singer
Madison Beer, singer
Tessa Thompson, actress and singer
Martyn Lawrence Bullard, interior designer
Nicole Byer, stand-up comedian
Sarah Hyland, actress
Jeffrey Bowyer-Chapman, actor and Canada's Drag Race judge
Tommy Dorfman, actor
Bebe Rexha, singer
Jane Krakowski, actress and singer
Sam Richardson, actor
Todrick Hall, singer and choreographer

Special guests 
Guests who appeared in episodes but did not judge on the main stage (in order of appearance):

Episode 2
Leland, singer-songwriter, composer, and record producer
Freddy Scott, composer and actor
Episode 8
Monét X Change and Trinity the Tuck, contestants on season ten and nine, respectively, and winners of the fourth season of All Stars

Episodes

Ratings

References

RuPaul's Drag Race All Stars seasons
2020 American television seasons
2020 in LGBT history
VH1
Television series impacted by the COVID-19 pandemic